Charles Coventry may refer to:

Charles Coventry (British Army officer) (1867–1929), English cricketer and British Army officer
Charles Coventry (Zimbabwean cricketer) (born 1983), Zimbabwean cricketer
Charles Coventry (umpire) (1958–2011), Zimbabwean cricket umpire